The gens Laetilia was a minor Roman family during the final century of the Republic and under the early Empire.  It is known chiefly from a few individuals.

Members

 Lucius Laetilius, the regular tabellarius, or courier, of Verres.
 Gaius Laetilius M. f. Apalus, together with Ptolemaeus, son of Juba II, one of the duumvirs at Carthago Nova or Gades, named on inscriptions from coins.
 Lucius Laetilius, mentioned in an inscription from Dalmatia, dating to the first or early second century.

See also
List of Roman gentes

References

Bibliography
 Marcus Tullius Cicero, In Verrem.
 Joseph Hilarius Eckhel, Doctrina Numorum Veterum (The Study of Ancient Coins, 1792–1798).
 Dictionary of Greek and Roman Biography and Mythology, William Smith, ed., Little, Brown and Company, Boston (1849).
 Theodor Mommsen et alii, Corpus Inscriptionum Latinarum (The Body of Latin Inscriptions, abbreviated CIL), Berlin-Brandenburgische Akademie der Wissenschaften (1853–present).
 August Pauly, Georg Wissowa, et alii, Realencyclopädie der Classischen Altertumswissenschaft (Scientific Encyclopedia of the Knowledge of Classical Antiquities, abbreviated RE or PW), J. B. Metzler, Stuttgart (1894–1980).
 Attilio Degrassi, Inscriptiones Latinae Liberae Rei Publicae, (Free Latin Inscriptions of the Republic), La Nuova Italia, Florence (1957–1963).

Roman gentes